Aaron Gavey (born February 22, 1974) is a Canadian former professional ice hockey player. He last played in the Deutsche Eishockey Liga for the Kölner Haie (Cologne Sharks).

Playing career
As a youth, Gavey played in the 1987 Quebec International Pee-Wee Hockey Tournament with a minor ice hockey team from Cornwall, Ontario.

Gavey played his minor hockey for the Peterborough Minor Petes (OMHA) before spending 1990-91 season as a 16-year-old playing for the Peterborough Roadrunners Jr.B. club. Following that season he was selected in the 1st round (15th overall) in the 1991 OHL Priority Selection held in Kitchener, Ontario.

Gavey played major junior hockey for the Sault Ste. Marie Greyhounds in the Ontario Hockey League from 1991 through 1994, during which time he tallied 94 goals and 110 assists in 170 games.  The Greyhounds played in the Memorial Cup all three years, winning the tournament in 1993 and finishing as the runner-up in 1992.

Gavey was drafted 74th overall by the Tampa Bay Lightning in the 1992 NHL Entry Draft and has played for six different NHL teams including the Tampa Bay Lightning, Calgary Flames, Dallas Stars, Minnesota Wild, Toronto Maple Leafs, and the Mighty Ducks of Anaheim. He has played 355 career NHL games, scoring 41 goals and 50 assists for 91 points.

During the 2004/05 season he had a very brief stint with the Storhamar Dragons of Hamar, Norway. He only played two games before leaving the club. He moved to Germany and played for the Kölner Haie in season 2006/07. His contract was not renewed.

Career statistics

Regular season and playoffs

References

External links

1954 births
Living people
Atlanta Knights players
Calgary Flames players
Canadian ice hockey centres
Dallas Stars players
Ice hockey people from Ontario
Kalamazoo Wings (1974–2000) players
Kölner Haie players
Mighty Ducks of Anaheim players
Minnesota Wild players
Portland Pirates players
Saint John Flames players
St. John's Maple Leafs players
Sault Ste. Marie Greyhounds players
Sportspeople from Greater Sudbury
Storhamar Dragons players
Tampa Bay Lightning draft picks
Tampa Bay Lightning players
Toronto Maple Leafs players
Utah Grizzlies (AHL) players
Canadian expatriate ice hockey players in Norway
Canadian expatriate ice hockey players in Germany